Island Boys are an American hip hop duo who gained notoriety via the video sharing platform TikTok. The duo is made up of twin rappers Kodiyakredd (Franky Venegas) and Flyysoulja (Alex Venegas) and is based in South Florida. The group went viral due to the success of their song "I'm an Island Boy".

Career
While in jail as teenagers, the brothers decided to pursue a rap career. In October 2021, a video of the duo performing a song went viral on Twitter. The pair's distinctive appearance, including tattoos, diamond teeth, and vertical dreadlocks helped turn their video into a meme that gained traction on Tiktok. They subsequently turned down a record deal with Kodak Black. Their first major performance took place in November of that year following the debut of their official music video.

Personal lives 
The rap duo are fraternal twins, with given names Franky and Alex Venegas. They were born on July 16, 2001 and are of Cuban ancestry. In a podcast interview, the twins explained that their father died when they were young and they were raised by their single mother. Growing up, the twins were often in trouble with the law and committed crimes including burglaries and stealing cars.

Flyysoulja has a daughter.

Controversies 
The Island Boys have been involved in multiple social media feuds involving other social media personalities such as brothers Logan Paul and Jake Paul, TikTok star Bryce Hall, and even mainstream celebrities such as comedian Kevin Hart and rapper Snoop Dogg. Hart and Snoop Dogg notably mocked the twins on their comedy special "2021 and Done." On the 75-minute special, Hart and Snoop Dogg reviewed a collection of the most viral videos of the past year, which included the Island Boys' viral debut. While watching the TikTok clip, Snoop Dogg held his head in his hands, saying "I'm speechless. Two goofballs in a pool." Hart then responded "I'm not speechless. You know why?" and then began to mockingly sing the Island Boys' song from the video clip.

The pair first clashed with Logan Paul after being invited onto his podcast "Impaulsive" and disagreeing with Paul's co-host George Janko regarding financial advice. Janko suggested that the brothers invest money from their initial success in case their career as rappers didn't prove lucrative in the future. The brothers responded by saying that they did not need financial advice, and Alex addressed Janko by saying "I probably make more money than you." The pair later attended a boxing match in support of Paul, but were allegedly "kicked out for throwing shoes" according to online commentator Keemstar. When the boys entered the boxing arena, they were booed by Paul's fans for walking off of "Impaulsive." Paul's brother, Jake Paul, discussed the controversy on the next episode of "Impaulsive," saying "For you to have the audacity to stand up to George Janko, the nicest guy in the world, ... you're a fucking punk." 

On January 5, 2022 the twins made a commissioned video through Cameo, a platform that allows celebrities to be paid to make custom videos for fans. The video was reposted on TikTok by a Texas-based army recruiter named Orlando Tamez, and shows the brothers saying "Big shoutout to Staff Sergeant Tamez, you're changing lives, giving you $50K...Giving out bonuses? Paid vacation? And free college, no money." The video was reposted again onto the website Reddit in a subreddit called r/Army. The video sparked controversy and resulted in a representative for the US Army Recruiting Command making the following statement to NBC: "The Island Boys Cameo was not reviewed, authorized, nor paid for by US Army Recruiting Command as an official marketing tool. We are investigating the situation and requiring the individual recruiter to remove the TikTok account, as it is not authorized for official use at this time."

On February 7, 2022, the Venegas brothers' home in Florida was raided by police. A man named Andrew James Thomas, a childhood friend of the Venegas brothers, was arrested on the property in connection to a drive-by shooting that killed an 8-year-old girl just three days before. The Venegas brothers are not implicated in the case, and their manager Dovi Bezner told press that the twins' childhood friend had been staying in their home and said "We had no clue about any of these allegations towards him. We just knew him as a good person, someone that grew up with the Island Boys. If we knew something like this was going on we never would have allowed him on the property." Thomas currently faces charges of first-degree murder with a firearm, being a felon in possession of a firearm, and attempted first-degree murder with a firearm.

The twins have also been accused of cultural appropriation and have been criticized for using racial slurs, such as in their song "Wicked Way."

Discography 
Studio albums

 17 (2022, credited as Flyysoulja)
 TRENDSETTERS (2022, credited as Kodiyakredd)

References 

Pop rappers
American TikTokers
Hip hop duos
American twins
American musicians of Cuban descent
2001 births
Living people